Roger Janssen (born 21 April 1977) is a former Belgian professional darts player who has played in the British Darts Organisation (BDO) events.

Career

Janssen's career began with the 2012 Belgium Open, in which he finished among the Last 64. Since then he has competed in various other competitions, getting to several quarter and semi finals. His, so far, only win was in the 2015 Hal Masters where he beat Martin Adams 3–2.

World Championship results

BDO

 2017: Last 40 (lost to Mark McGrath 2–3) (sets)
 2019: Last 32 (lost to Jim Williams 2–3)

References

External links
 Profile at Darts Database

Belgian darts players
Living people
British Darts Organisation players
1977 births